Balayan, officially the Municipality of Balayan, is a 1st class municipality in the province of Batangas, Philippines. According to the 2020 census, it has a population of 95,913 people.

The town is rich among the natural resources of sugarcanes, coconuts and corn. Significant events includes the Parada ng Lechon (every June 24) and the Feast of Immaculate Conception celebrated annually every December 8. Widely known products originating from the area include the Bagoong Balayan.

Etymology
Balayan is derived from the Old Tagalog word balayan, meaning "to walk past the paddy, from a basket to another" and "carry or accomplish anything with the tip of any batten". Other possible source is from the old Tagalog word balayang which means "wood".

History

Tagalog literatures in Balayan were lost and destroyed at the coming of the Spaniards. Jesuit Father Chirino testified they found (300) three hundred pre-colonial manuscripts in Balayan but to facilitate them the propagation of the Roman Catholic faith, early Jesuit missionaries destroyed the records.

Scholars and historians believed that Tagalog songs: Kumintang and Kundiman originated from Balayan. Spanish writer and historian Wenceslao E. Retana recorded the lyrics of a popular Kundiman when he visited Batangas in 1888.

Balayan has a close affinity to early history. The towns position on the basin of a good harbour was one of the reasons it became the first lands for local settlements in the Philippines, with existing records of local indigenous residents exchanging barter goods with Chinese traders dating back to the mid-14th century.

It was once the capital of a Moro Sultanate named Bon-bon whose area includes Mindoro to Cavite and even some parts of Metro Manila.The indigenous inhabitants of Balayan has close ties with the Brunei Sultanate of Maynilad under the leadership of Rajah Sulayman I and his uncle Rajah Matanda. There are historical accounts that Rajah Sulayman I stayed on this area when he tried to battle the Spaniards around Intramuros. In 1578, Balayan covered the modern-day municipality and some areas of Calaca, Calatagan, Lian, Nasugbu and Tuy. It became the capital of Balayan Province (present-day Batangas) from 1597 to 1732. It was the most progressive town of the Province and the traditional center of governance. The eruption of the Taal Volcano destroyed a significant portion of the town, moving the provincial capital to Bonbon (present-day Taal) in 1732 and the name of the province was renamed after that town.

Despite the presence of Spanish forces protected by the newly built stonefort in nearby Maynilad or Manila, Fort Santiago and Fort Intramuros Philippines, due to its natural harbor, a number of areas around the archipelago were often become launching grounds of counterattacks from the seafaring Moro people.

These events prompted local Spanish officials to set up a fort to prevent yearly Moro counterattacks.

From 3rd class municipality in 1992, Balayan jumped to 2nd class municipality in 1995, and to 1st class in July 1996, suggesting the continuous improvement of Balayan's financial status.

Geography

Balayan is a lowland town in western Batangas. According to the Philippine Statistics Authority, the municipality has a land area of  constituting  of the  total area of Batangas.

Balayan is bounded on the north by Tuy, west by Calatagan and Lian, east by Calaca, and south by the Balayan Bay.

Topography
Balayan is strategically located at the center of western Batangas. The town is bounded on the north by Tuy, north-east by Nasugbu, east by Calaca, west by Lian, south-west by Calatagan, and south by Balayan Bay.

Climate

Balayan falls under the first type of climate: Dry season from November to April and Wet season from May to October.

Barangays

Balayan is politically subdivided into 48 barangays. The largest barangay in town is Patugo while the smallest is District 12.

Demographics

In the 2020 census, Balayan had a population of 95,913.

The main language used by the people in Balayan is Tagalog but some can still speak and understand basic Spanish. Literate people can speak English but it is often used in formal occasions or events only.

Religion

Churches:
Immaculate Conception Parish Church (Balayan)
Ermita Church
Jesus the Peace Maker Christian Church
Jesus Is Lord Church

Economy

Phil Steel Corporation (Steelcorp) – manufacturer of coated steel sheets, coils and irons
Batangas Sugar Cane Central – the mother company of Muscuvado Food Sugar Corp. and processes sugar cane
ProGreen Distillery (Emperador)
Walter Mart Balayan
Me & City Shoppers Mall Balayan

Government

Incumbent officials
Mayor – Emmanuel Salvador "JR" Fronda
Vice Mayor – Atty. Efren R. Chavez
Councilors:

Raquel Aniwasal
Raymund De La Vega
Joebert Mapalad
Jhun Santos
Alfred Solis
Demet Hernandez
Bernardo Pantoja
Elmer Del Carmen

Tourism
In January 2009, Balayan renovated a mini park called Balayan BayWalk Park which provides locals and tourists a view of Balayan Bay similar to what is seen in the country's capital Manila.

Healthcare

Hospitals in Balayan include: 
Medical Center Western Batangas 
Balayan Bayview Hospital and Medical Center
Don Manuel Lopez Memorial District Hospital
Metro Balayan Medical Center

Education

Balayan has several schools, institutions and university both public and private located within and outside the Poblacion.

Public schools include:
Balayan East Central School
Balayan West Central School
Balayan National High School
Batangas State University – Balayan Campus

Private schools include:

Immaculate Conception College
Blessed Christ Child Montessori Foundation
Balayan Colleges
Balayan Kiddie Learning Center
Our Lady of Miracles Learning Center
STI College – Balayan
Kim Harold Computer and Technical School (Fraternidad St.) 
Core Science Academy
Saint Paul College Balayan
Schola Nazaria Inc.
Kiddie Learning

Notable personalities
Sixto C. López – propagandist and negotiator for Philippine independence from the United States
Leo Martinez - actor, comedian, and director
Kim de Leon - winner of 7th season of StarStruck

References

External links

[ Philippine Standard Geographic Code]

Municipalities of Batangas
Former provincial capitals of the Philippines